Phacopsis vulpicidae is a species of lichenicolous (lichen-dwelling) fungus in the family Parmeliaceae. It was formally described as a new species in 2019 by mycologists Mikhail P. Zhurbenko and Paul Diederich. There, in the upper limit of a Larix sibirica forest, the fungus was found growing on the thallus of a ground-dwelling Vulpicida juniperina lichen. The species epithet vulpicidae refers to the genus of its host. Infections by the fungus cause blister-like (bullate) swellings of the host thallus. It is known to occur in arctic and mountain tundra and taiga biomes of Asia, Europe, and North America (Alaska). Its only recorded host is Vulpicida juniperina, and almost all recorded host specimens have been terricolous.

References

Parmeliaceae
Fungi described in 2019
Fungi of Asia
Fungi of Europe
Fungi of North America
Lichenicolous fungi
Taxa named by Mikhail Petrovich Zhurbenko